Buchenavia capitata is a tree of the Caribbean and northeastern South-American regions.  Its Spanish vernacular names include granadillo (Puerto Rico), almendro (Colombia), amarillo and olivo negro (Venezuela), and mirindiba and periquiteira (Brazil).  Its English vernacular name is fourleaf buchenavia. It is also known as Buchenavia tetraphylla (Aubl.) Howard.

Taxonomy
It belongs to the order of Myrtales in the class of Equisetopsida. It is considered a synonym of Buchenavia tetraphylla, which is considered the accepted name.

Characteristics
This tree grows to a height of 60 to 80 ft and 2 to 4 ft in diameter; has rather large buttresses, but has good log form above them.

Habitat
This tree is common in the Toro Negro State Forest. It is native to Puerto Rico and the United States Virgin Islands.

References

capitata
Trees of South America